Kameshkovsky District is an administrative and municipal district (raion), one of the sixteen in Vladimir Oblast, Russia. It is located in the north of the oblast. Its administrative center is the town of Kameshkovo. Population:   37,961 (2002 Census);  The population of Kameshkovo accounts for 39.0% of the district's total population.

References

Notes

Sources

Districts of Vladimir Oblast